El Grillo (The Cricket) is a frottola by Josquin des Prez. Possibly written in the early 16th century, it is regarded as one of Josquin's most popular works.

History
Published in the early sixteenth century, El Grillo is attributed to an "Iosquin Dascanio", traditionally identified as French composer Josquin des Prez. Several scholars have posited that Josquin wrote the song to either honour or make fun of his colleague at the House of Sforza, an Italian court singer named Carlo Grillo. This would have to have been no earlier than the 1490s. The Frottole libro tertio, published by Ottaviano Petrucci in 1505, is the only contemporaneous source of El Grillo. It received considerably little attention from modern musicologists until 1931, when it was included in Geschichte der Musik in Beispielen by Arnold Schering.

Analysis
The song is scored for four voices. Written from a third-person perspective, El Grillo concerns the cricket. The opening section is about the cricket's lengthy song, while the second one compares crickets and songbirds. The song concludes by suggesting that crickets may be better singers than songbirds, particularly because they sing all the time, rain or shine. The song contains both homophony and onomatopoeia, with its rhythm mimicking a cricket's mannerisms. Uncharacteristically for a frottola, the ripresa of the poetic lines mostly have seven syllables, whereas the piedi and volta have eight. According to musicologist Jaap van Benthem, the number of notes in the ripresa (88) spells "Des Prez" in gematria, while the 99 notes in the volta spell "Josquin".

Legacy
El Grillo is considered one of Josquin's most popular works. Willem Elders calls it "one of the most brilliant songs of the late fifteenth century", while Richard Sherr describes it as a "delightful jokey little piece." Henry Vyverberg writes that it "represents the frottola at its most attractive."

References

Citations

Works cited

 
 
 
 
  
 
 
 

Renaissance music
Compositions by Josquin des Prez
16th-century compositions